Jimmy Connors won the singles title at the 1982 Queen's Club Championships tennis tournament defeating defending champion John McEnroe in the final 7–5, 6–3.

Seeds

  John McEnroe (final)
  Jimmy Connors (champion)
  Sandy Mayer (second round)
  Brian Teacher (third round)
  Mark Edmondson (quarterfinals)
  Steve Denton (first round)
  Brian Gottfried (quarterfinals)
  Chip Hooper (quarterfinals)
  John Sadri (third round)
  Hank Pfister (third round)
  Tim Mayotte (second round)
  Chris Lewis (semifinals)
  Kevin Curren (semifinals)
  Kim Warwick (first round)
  Rod Frawley (first round)
  Bruce Manson (first round)

Draw

Finals

Top half

Section 1

Section 2

Bottom half

Section 3

Section 4

References

External links
Official website Queen's Club Championships 
ATP tournament profile

Singles